In mathematics, a Solinas prime, or generalized Mersenne prime, is a prime number that has the form , where  is a low-degree polynomial with small integer coefficients. These primes allow fast modular reduction algorithms and are widely used in cryptography. They are named after Jerome Solinas.

This class of numbers encompasses a few other categories of prime numbers:
 Mersenne primes, which have the form ,
 Crandall or pseudo-Mersenne primes, which have the form  for small odd .

Modular reduction algorithm
Given a number  with up to  bits, we want to find a number congruent to  mod  with only as many bits as  – that is, with at most  bits.

First, represent  in base :

Then if we denote by  the integer vector given by:

,

it can be easily checked that:

.

Examples
Four of the recommended primes in NIST's document "Recommended Elliptic Curves for Federal Government Use" are Solinas primes:
 p-192 
 p-224 
 p-256 
 p-384 

Curve448 uses the Solinas prime

See also
 Mersenne prime

References

Classes of prime numbers

fr:Nombre de Mersenne premier#Généralisations